The Flute Concerto No. 1 in G major, K. 313, was written in 1778 by Wolfgang Amadeus Mozart.  Commissioned by the Dutch flautist Ferdinand De Jean in 1777, Mozart was supposed to provide four flute quartets and three flute concertos, yet he only completed two of the three concertos, K. 313 being the first. The Andante for Flute and Orchestra K. 315 may have been written as an alternative slow movement for this concerto, but there is no extant manuscript and it is therefore difficult to ascertain Mozart's intentions clearly (this also means that current editions are based on the earliest editions rather than an autograph).

The piece is scored for a standard set of orchestral strings, two oboes (which are replaced with two flutes in the Adagio movement), and two horns. It runs about 25 minutes. 

The piece is divided into three movements:
 Allegro maestoso
 Adagio ma non troppo
 Rondo: Tempo di Menuetto

Media

References

External links

Concertos by Wolfgang Amadeus Mozart
Mozart 01
Compositions in G major
1778 compositions